Lamin Bunja Jawneh (born 31 October 1995) is a Gambian footballer who last played for Phoenix Rising FC in the USL Championship.

Career 
Jawneh spent time with NPSL sides Inter Nashville and SGFC Eagles Maryland, before moving to Greek side Ialysos following a trial with the club.

On 23 January 2020, Jawneh signed with USL Championship side Atlanta United 2.

On 22 June 2022, Jawneh signed with Phoenix Rising FC on a 25-day contract. On 14 July, Jawneh's contract was extended through the end of the 2022 season. On 21 October, Phoenix Rising announced they had declined the 2023 contract option for Jawneh.

References

External links 
 

1995 births
Living people
Sportspeople from Banjul
Gambian footballers
Association football forwards
Inter Nashville FC players
GAS Ialysos 1948 F.C. players
Atlanta United 2 players
Moca FC players
Phoenix Rising FC players
National Premier Soccer League players
USL Championship players
Gambian expatriate footballers
Gambian expatriate sportspeople in the United States
Expatriate soccer players in the United States
Expatriate footballers in Greece
Expatriate footballers in the Dominican Republic